Robert Boog Watson FRSE (26 September 1823 – 23 June 1910) was a Scottish malacologist and minister of the Free Church of Scotland best known as the author of the report on the Scaphopoda and Gastropoda collected during the H.M.S. Challenger expedition to survey the world's oceans from 1873 to 1876.  Watson also described various Opisthobranchia from Madeira.

Life

He was born in Burntisland in Fife, the son of the Rev Dr Charles Watson DD (1794-1866) of Burntisland and Isabella Boog. His brother, Sir Patrick Heron Watson was an eminent surgeon and a pioneer of modern dentistry. The family moved permanently to Edinburgh around 1840, living at 19 Royal Terrace on Calton Hill.

He was educated at Edinburgh Academy. He served as Chaplain to the Highland Brigade during the Crimean War, and later in Madeira. In 1858 he was living with his wife in Bombay in India.

He was elected a Fellow of the Royal Society of Edinburgh in 1862. During his stay in Edinburgh he lived with his brother Patrick Heron Watson at Hope Street off Charlotte Square. From 1864 to 1874 he served on the island of Madeira.

From 1877 onwards he is recorded as living at 19 Chalmers Street on the south side of Edinburgh.

He died in Edinburgh and is buried in the south-west section of Grange Cemetery with his wife Janet. The grave lies in the eastern row facing west. It bears the inscription "Worthy is the Lamb that was Slain".

Family

In 1857 he was married to Janet Cowan (1831-1912) daughter of Alexander Cowan of Valleyfield.

Their daughter, the writer Helen Brodie Cowan Watson, married Major General William Burney Bannerman FRSE (1858–1924), the son of Rev James Bannerman. Their son was the engineer and antiquarian Charles Brodie Boog Watson FRSE (1858-1947) and granddaughter was writer and broadcaster Elspeth Janet Boog Watson.

He was related through the marriage of Jane Elisabeth Boog to the Very Rev Matthew Leishman of Govan Old Parish Church.

He was also related through his aunt, Christian Boog, to Mary Somerville, making her a distant aunt.

Publications
Geology of Luneburg
The Great Drift Beds with Shells in the South of Arran
Disruption in the Church of Canton de Vaud, Switzerland

References

Sources
 *   Robert Boog Watson B.A., F.R.S.E., F.L.S, Mollusca of H.M.S. ‘Challenger’ Expedition.—Part VIII; Journal of the Linnean Society of London, Zoology, Volume 15, Issue 87, pages 388–412, October 1881

Scottish zoologists
1823 births
1910 deaths
People educated at Edinburgh Academy
People from Burntisland
19th-century Ministers of the Free Church of Scotland
British malacologists